Brown's Ferry Park may refer to:

Brown's Ferry Park (Tualatin, Oregon)
Brown's Ferry Park (South Carolina), a park on Old Brown's Ferry Road in Georgetown County, South Carolina

See also
Brown's Ferry (disambiguation)